"This Side Up" is a single by Danish singer Jon Nørgaard, from his debut album This Side Up. It was released in 2003. The song peaked at number 11 on the Danish Singles Chart.

Track listing
Album version
 "This Side Up" - 3:26

Chart performance

Release history

References

2003 singles
Jon Nørgaard songs
2002 songs
Song articles with missing songwriters